Mieczysław Edwin Łopatka (born 10 October 1939) is a Polish former professional basketball player and coach. At a height of 1.96 m (6'5") tall, and a weight of 96 kg (212 lbs.), he played at the small forward position.

Club career
Łopatka was a member of the FIBA European Selection, in 1969. He won 2 Polish League championships (1965, 1970), and the Polish Cup (1972). He led the Polish League in scoring 4 times (1961, 1963, 1966, 1967), and he was a two time Polish League Player of the Year (1965, 1969).

National team career
As a member of the senior Polish national basketball team, Łopatka competed at four Summer Olympic Games (1960, 1964, 1968, 1972). He won a silver medal at EuroBasket 1963, and bronze medals at EuroBasket 1965, and EuroBasket 1967. He was a member of the FIBA World Cup All-Tournament Team, at the 1967 FIBA World Championship, and he also led the tournament in scoring.

Coaching career
In his coaching career, Łopatka won 8 Polish League championships (1977, 1979, 1980, 1981, 1991, 1992, 1993, 1994), and 3 Polish Cups (1977, 1980, 1992).

External links
FIBA Profile
FIBA Europe Profile

1939 births
Living people
Basketball players at the 1960 Summer Olympics
Basketball players at the 1964 Summer Olympics
Basketball players at the 1968 Summer Olympics
Basketball players at the 1972 Summer Olympics
Lech Poznań (basketball) players
Olympic basketball players of Poland
Polish men's basketball players
Polish basketball coaches
People from Gniezno County
Sportspeople from Greater Poland Voivodeship
Small forwards
FIBA Hall of Fame inductees
1967 FIBA World Championship players